Tokyu may refer to:

 Tokyu Group, a group of companies centered on Tokyu Corporation
 Tokyu Corporation, a Japanese railway company, the largest member and parent company of the group
 Tokyu Car Corporation, a former Japanese railway vehicle manufacturer, now the Japan Transport Engineering Company
 Tokyu Hands Creative Life Store, a member of the Tokyu Group
 Tokyu Department Store, a department store chain based in Japan

See also 
 Tokyo (disambiguation)